The Poplar Grove Vintage Wings and Wheels Museum is an interactive museum of technology and history at Poplar Grove Airport located south of Poplar Grove, Illinois. The museum contains a number of historic hangar buildings filled with artifacts and exhibits which document aircraft, air crews and the history of powered flight.

References

External links
 Official site.

Museums in Boone County, Illinois
History museums in Illinois